Madison County is a county located in the U.S. state of Iowa. As of the 2020 census, the population was 16,548. The county seat is Winterset.

Madison County is included in the Des Moines–West Des Moines, IA Metropolitan Statistical Area.

Madison County is famous for being the county where John Wayne was born, and for a number of covered bridges.  These bridges were featured in Robert James Waller's 1992 novella The Bridges of Madison County, as well as the 1995 film and 2014 musical based on it.

History
Madison County was formed on January 13, 1846.  It has been self-governed since 1849.  It was named after James Madison (1751–1836), the fourth President of the United States (between 1809 and 1817). Hiram Hurst was the first European -American settler in Madison County, having come from Missouri about April 15, 1846.

Geography

Major highways
 Interstate 80 (in the far northwestern corner of the county)
 U.S. Highway 6
 U.S. Highway 169
 Iowa Highway 92

Adjacent counties
 Dallas County  (north)
 Warren County  (east)
 Clarke County  (southeast)
 Union County  (southwest)
 Adair County  (west)
 Polk County  (northeast)

Demographics

2020 census
There were 6,913 housing units, of which 6,436 were occupied.

2010 census
There were 6,554 housing units, of which 6,025 were occupied.

2000 census

As of the census of 2000, there were 14,019 people, 5,326 households, and 3,925 families in the county. There were 5,661 housing units at an average density of 10 per square mile (4/km2). The racial makeup of the county was 98.57% White, 0.09% Black or African American, 0.27% Native American, 0.18% Asian, 0.02% Pacific Islander, 0.19% from other races, and 0.68% from two or more races.  0.75% of the population were Hispanic or Latino of any race.

Of the 5,326 households 34.80% had children under the age of 18 living with them, 63.90% were married couples living together, 7.00% had a female householder with no husband present, and 26.30% were non-families. 22.70% of households were one person and 11.70% were one person aged 65 or older.  The average household size was 2.58 and the average family size was 3.04.

The age distribution was 27.10% under the age of 18, 6.90% from 18 to 24, 27.40% from 25 to 44, 23.40% from 45 to 64, and 15.20% 65 or older.  The median age was 38 years. For every 100 females, there were 97.40 males.  For every 100 females age 18 and over, there were 93.10 males.

The median household income was $41,845 and the median family income  was $48,289. Males had a median income of $31,126 versus $24,095 for females. The per capita income for the county was $19,357.  About 4.60% of families and 6.70% of the population were below the poverty line, including 6.60% of those under age 18 and 10.40% of those age 65 or over.

Covered bridges

There are five extant covered bridges in Madison County, of the original nineteen:
The rebuilt bridge was destroyed by a fire in 2017.
Featured in the 1995 movie The Bridges of Madison County.

The remaining covered bridges were designed by Harvey P. Jones and George K. Foster, with the following exceptions: Eli Cox built the Cutler-Donahoe Bridge, and J. P. Clark built the Imes Bridge.

Tunnel
Madison County is home to the only highway tunnel in Iowa, Harmon Tunnel, through the neck of an incised meander of the Middle River in Pammel Park.

Communities

Incorporated Communities

Bevington
Earlham
East Peru
Macksburg
Patterson
St. Charles
Truro
Winterset

Unincorporated communities
Barney
Old Peru
Pitzer
Webster

Townships

 Crawford
 Douglas
 Grand River
 Jackson
 Jefferson
 Lee
 Lincoln
 Madison
 Monroe
 Ohio
 Penn
 Scott
 South
 Union
 Walnut
 Webster

Population ranking
The population ranking of the following table is based on the 2020 census of Madison County.

† county seat

Politics
For most of its history, Madison County has primarily supported the Republican Party in presidential elections. From 1880 to 1960, the county only failed to back the party's candidate in 1932 when Herbert Hoover was defeated in a national landslide for reelection by Franklin D. Roosevelt. The county was much more of a swing area between 1964 & 1996, voting for the national winner in every presidential election between 1964 & 2004 aside from 1988 when Michael Dukakis was boosted to an inflated margin of victory statewide by a farm crisis. Since the start of the second millennium, Republicans have carried the county in every presidential election. Donald Trump also produced the county's strongest Republican presidential victory since 1952 in 2016, winning by a margin of over 30 percent.

See also

Madison County Courthouse
National Register of Historic Places listings in Madison County, Iowa

References

External links

County website
Madison County Chamber of Commerce
Madison County Development Group
 

 
1846 establishments in Iowa Territory
Des Moines metropolitan area
Populated places established in 1846